Samar's at-large congressional district was the provincewide electoral district for Philippine national legislatures in both the undivided province of Samar before its 1965 partition and the western third that adopted its name which was created as a result of that division from 1965 to 1986.

Samar first elected its representatives at-large in the 1943 Philippine legislative election for a seat in the National Assembly of the Second Philippine Republic. Before 1943, the undivided island province was represented in the national legislatures through its first, second and third districts. The former province was also earlier represented in the Malolos Congress of the First Philippine Republic in 1898 by appointed delegates from Luzon.

The three districts were restored in Samar ahead of the 1941 Philippine House of Representatives elections whose elected representatives only began to serve following the dissolution of the Second Republic and the restoration of the Philippine Commonwealth in 1945. An at-large district would not be used in the province until after the 1965 division that created three new provinces with three separate lone congressional districts based more or less on the existing districts, and one of which, Western Samar, adopted the name of Samar in 1969. The successor province elected its representative in this manner in the 1969 Philippine House of Representatives elections. The district was immediately dissolved due to absence of a national legislature from 1972 to 1978. It was last recreated for the 1984 Philippine parliamentary election and became obsolete following the 1987 reapportionment under a new constitution.

Representation history

See also
Legislative districts of Samar

References

Former congressional districts of the Philippines
Politics of Samar (province)
1898 establishments in the Philippines
1901 disestablishments in the Philippines
1943 establishments in the Philippines
1944 disestablishments in the Philippines
1965 establishments in the Philippines
1972 disestablishments in the Philippines
1984 establishments in the Philippines
1986 disestablishments in the Philippines
At-large congressional districts of the Philippines
Congressional districts of Eastern Visayas
Constituencies established in 1898
Constituencies disestablished in 1901
Constituencies established in 1943
Constituencies disestablished in 1944
Constituencies established in 1965
Constituencies disestablished in 1972
Constituencies established in 1984
Constituencies disestablished in 1986